Bruno Fritz (4 March 1900 – 12 June 1984) was a German actor. He appeared in more than sixty films from 1934 to 1971.

Selected filmography

References

External links 

1900 births
1984 deaths
German male film actors
Rundfunk im amerikanischen Sektor people